Beata Choma is a Polish ballooning athlete.

Records and achievements 
In 2014, Beata Choma represented Poland for the first FAI Women's World Hot Air Balloon Championship. She finished the competition in 13th place by acquiring a total of more than 9000 points.

She became the 4th European Women's Balloon Champion which was held in Leszno between 3 and 10 September 2017, overtaking Agne Simonaviciute. She secured 14127 points defeating Agne who secured 14026 points.

Choma took part in World Ballooning Championship held in Battle Creek, Michigan.

References

External links 
 

Polish sportswomen
Place of birth missing (living people)
Year of birth missing (living people)
Living people
Polish balloonists
Maria Curie-Skłodowska University alumni